The N-VI is a major highway in Spain.  It connects Madrid to A Coruña.

It has generally been up-graded or replaced by the Autovía A-6. It passes via Tordesillas, Ponferrada and Lugo.

N-VI